Luna commonly refers to:
 Earth's Moon, named "Luna" in Latin
 Luna (goddess), the ancient Roman personification of the Moon

Luna may also refer to:

Places

Philippines
 Luna, Apayao
 Luna, Isabela
 Luna, La Union
 Luna, San Jose

Romania
 Luna, Negrești-Oaș town, Satu Mare County
 Luna, Cluj
 Luna de Jos, Dăbâca Commune, Cluj County
 Luna de Sus, Florești, Cluj 
 Luna River

United States
 Luna, Arkansas
 Luna, Missouri
 Luna, Minnesota
 Luna, New Mexico
 Luna County, New Mexico
 Luna Island, in Niagara Falls, New York
 Luna Lake (Arizona), a natural body of water
 Luna Pier, Michigan, a city

Other places
 Luna (Etruria), a city in ancient Etruria (now Italy) destroyed by the Arabs in 1016
 Luna, Aragon, Spain
 Luna, Rajasthan, India
 Luna forest, on the north bank of the Danube, according to Ptolemy
 Luna Peak (disambiguation)
 Roverè della Luna, a commune in Italy
 Luna, former name of Louny, a town in the Czech Republic

Arts, entertainment and media

Fictional entities

 Luna (comics), in comic books published by Marvel Comics
 Luna, a class of starship in Star Trek: Titan
 Luna, a moon and character in children's TV series Let's Go Luna!

Film, television and radio
 Luna (1965 film), a Soviet popular science and science fiction film
 La Luna (1979 film), an Italian film by Bernardo Bertolucci
 Luna, a 1995 Spanish film by Alejandro Amenábar
 Luna, a 2014 British film by Dave McKean
 Luna (2017 film), written and directed by Khaled Kaissar
 Luna (TV series), a 1983-84 UK children's TV show
 Luna (XM), XM Radio channel 95
 Luna radio, the US FM radio station KLNN
 Radio Luna, a radio station in Montenegro
 RTV Luna, a television and radio company in Montenegro

Literature
 Luna (Odier novel), a 1979 novel by Delacorta
 Luna (Peters novel), a 2004 novel by Julie Anne Peters

Music

Performers
 Luna (1970s American band), a 1970s rock and roll band from Boston, Massachusetts
 Luna (1980s Serbian band), a 1980s post-punk/gothic rock band from Novi Sad, Serbia
 Luna (1990s American band), an alternative rock band from New York City, New York
 Luna (1990s Serbian band), a male/female pop group from Serbia

Albums
 Luna (Ana Gabriel album), 1993
 Luna (Faun album), 2014
 Luna (National Product album), 2007
 Luna (The Aliens album), 2008
 Luna, a 2004 album by Claudia Acuña
 Luna, a 2008 album by Tomasz Budzyński

Songs
 "Luna" (Beni Arashiro song)
 "Luna" (Eddy Lover song), 2008
 "Luna", by Juanes from Un Día Normal, 2002
 "Luna", by Arisa Mizuki from Arisa
 "Luna", by Moonspell from Memorial
 "Luna", by Tom Petty and The Heartbreakers from the album Tom Petty and the Heartbreakers
 "Luna", by The Smashing Pumpkins from Siamese Dream
 "Luna", by Alessandro Safina
 "Luna", by Bombay Bicycle Club
 "Luna", by Zoé from their album Reptilectric
 "Luna", by Ana Gabriel from her album Luna, 1993
 "Luna", by Gianluigi Di Franco, 1988
 "Luna", by Gianni Togni, 1980
 "La Luna" (song), a song by Belinda Carlisle
 "Luna", by Hayley Kiyoko from Panorama, 2022
 "Luna", by Oneus, 2021

Other uses in arts and entertainment
 Luna (sculpture), by Ellen Tykeson in Eugene, Oregon, U.S.

Businesses and brands
 LUNA Bar, an energy bar marketed to women by Clif Bar & Co
 Luna Guitars, a guitar manufacturer
 Luna Innovations, a company based in Roanoke, Virginia, United States
 Luna Lounge, a former bar in Manhattan, New York, U.S.
 Luna Park, various amusement parks
 Luna Publications, a literary publishing company in Toronto, Ontario, Canada

People
 Luna (name), including a list of people and characters with this given name and surname
 Luna (footballer) (born 1971), Spanish former professional footballer
 Luna (South Korean singer) (born 1993), member of South Korean girl group f(x)
 Luna (Ukrainian singer) (born 1990), pop singer and songwriter

Science and technology

Biology
 L98 Luna (orca), lost orca calf who lived in Nootka Sound between 2001 and 2006
 Luna (tree), a California redwood tree
 Luna moth, (Actias luna) a lime-green North American silk moth

Computing and telecommunication
 Luna (cryptocurrency)
 Luna (theme), the codename for the default theme of Windows XP
 LUNA, a computer product line of OMRON Tateishi Electric
 Nokia 8600 Luna, a mobile phone
 Amazon Luna, gaming service

Transportation
 Luna (rocket), carrier rockets used by the Soviet Union
 Luna (tugboat), a historic US tugboat
 Luna (yacht)
 Luna programme, a series of Soviet unmanned space missions
 Luna X 2000, a German unmanned aerial vehicle
 Kinetic Luna, a moped in India
 MV Luna, a German passenger ship
 2K6 Luna, a short-range Soviet ballistic missile
 9K52 Luna-M, also known as FROG-7, a Soviet artillery rocket

Other uses
 Luna, a type of small vessel which holds the Host in a monstrance

See also
 La Luna (disambiguation)
 La Lunatica, in the Marvel Comics universe
 "Lhuna", 2008 song by Coldplay and Kylie Minogue
 Loona (disambiguation)
 Luna City (disambiguation)
 Lunacy (disambiguation)
 Lunae, a Spanish pop group
 Lunamaria Hawke from Gundam Seed Destiny
 Luna Park (disambiguation)
 Lunas (disambiguation)
 Lunatic
 Lune (disambiguation)